Abbas Ali Kash (also Romanized as ‘Abbās ‘Alī Kash, ‘Abbās ‘Alī Kesh, and ‘Abbās ‘Alī Kosh; also known as ‘Abbāsābād) is a village in Rudpey-ye Jonubi Rural District, in the Central District of Sari County, Mazandaran Province, Iran. At the 2006 census, its population was 812, in 231 families.

References 

Populated places in Sari County